Saffron Domini Burrows (born 22 October 1972) is an English-American actress and model who has appeared in films such as Circle of Friends, Wing Commander, Deep Blue Sea, Gangster No. 1, Enigma, Troy, Reign Over Me and The Bank Job. On the small screen, she has starred as Lorraine Weller on Boston Legal, Dr. Norah Skinner on My Own Worst Enemy, Detective Serena Stevens on Law & Order: Criminal Intent and Victoria Hand on Marvel's Agents of S.H.I.E.L.D.. She appeared as Cynthia Taylor on the Amazon Video series Mozart in the Jungle and as Dottie Quinn in the Netflix series You.

Early life 
A Londoner, Burrows was born in St Pancras and grew up in Stoke Newington, her mother a trade unionist and primary school teacher in Hackney and her father an architect and teacher. Her parents and stepfather were Socialist Workers Party members, and Burrows was politically active from a young age.

Burrows attended William Tyndale Primary School in Islington and then Stoke Newington School. When asked for her preference of a school in Hackney or Hampstead, she said she wanted to be in a multicultural, inclusive environment. She enrolled in acting classes at the Anna Scher Theatre when she was 11.

Burrows had a successful modelling career after she was discovered at age 15 in Covent Garden by fashion photographer Beth Boldt. For five years she divided her time between London and Paris, where she learned French. She found the modelling world's "obsession with the ideal of the body" troubling.

Career

Acting 
Burrows made her film debut in 1993 with a small role in Jim Sheridan's In the Name of the Father. Her first significant acting roles came in 1995, as an ambitious young Irishwoman in Circle of Friends, and in Ngozi Onwurah's Welcome II The Terrordome. She starred in the BBC production of Dennis Potter's Karaoke (1996), and in Hotel de Love, Lovelife, Nevada, One Night Stand and The Matchmaker. In 1999 she appeared in Mike Figgis' experimental film The Loss of Sexual Innocence, where she played twins: one raised in England, the other in Italy. She appeared in the thriller film Deep Blue Sea, and had the title role in a film of Miss Julie, which premiered at the Toronto International Film Festival.

In 1999 she appeared with Stellan Skarsgård in Timecode (2000), a split-screen digital experimental film shot in a single take with no edits. She followed it with Gangster No. 1 with Malcolm McDowell, Paul Bettany and David Thewlis. She co-starred with Kate Winslet and Dougray Scott in Michael Apted's 1940s drama Enigma. She starred in Tempted, an improvised thriller set in New Orleans, with Burt Reynolds and Peter Facinelli.

Mike Figgis' ensemble feature Hotel followed, re-uniting Burrows with some colleagues from Timecode, including Salma Hayek and Danny Huston in Venice, where she played the Duchess of Malfi. In 2002, she had a cameo role in Hayek's produced biopic Frida.

She then dedicated herself to stage work. She was directed by Deborah Warner at the Royal National Theatre in Jeanette Winterson's The Powerbook. The play toured, visiting the Theatre National Du Chaillot, Paris, and the Teatro Argentina, Rome. Burrows performed in Spanish in The Galindez File, a film written by Spanish novelist Vazquez Montalban about a woman seeking the truth about the disappearance of a critic of the Dominican dictator Trujillo.

In 2004, she played the part of Andromache in Troy. In January 2005, she created the role of Janey in the world premiere of Earthly Paradise at the Almeida Theatre. The play of a love triangle between Janey Morris; her husband William Morris, the writer and proponent of the Arts and Crafts movement; and Dante Gabriel Rossetti, the Pre-Raphaelite painter. Theatre critic Nicholas De Jongh said of her performance in The Earthly Paradise that "Burrows takes to the stage like a swan to water ... She deserves no end of watching."

On 30 October 2005, she appeared on stage at the Old Vic theatre in London in a rehearsed reading of the 24-hour play Night Sky, alongside Christopher Eccleston. In 2006, Burrows was the female lead in the New Zealand thriller Perfect Creature. That same year, she worked with Chilean director Raoul Ruiz on Klimt, his cinematic version of the life of Gustav Klimt. In this film, she played opposite John Malkovich as the artist's lover, a woman of many personalities and nationalities.

She performed in Hal Hartley's Fay Grim. Onstage in 2006, Burrows starred opposite David Schwimmer in Neil Labute's world premiere of Some Girl(s) at the Gielgud theatre, London. She then starred opposite Don Cheadle and Adam Sandler in Mike Binder's Reign Over Me. Burrows played the female lead roles in the Indian film thriller Broken Thread, and in Dangerous Parking, a drama directed by Peter Howitt. On television, Burrows played attorney Lorraine Weller on ABC's Boston Legal (Season 4) from 2007 to 2008. She starred on NBC's 2008 series, My Own Worst Enemy.

In 2008, Burrows starred in the independent film The Guitar, Amy Redford's directorial debut, which premiered at the Sundance Film Festival. In 2008, she had a starring role as Martine Love in Roger Donaldson's heist film The Bank Job. She played opposite Kevin Spacey in Jonas Pate's Shrink. She has contributed to the Actors Come Clean for Congo video for the Raise Hope for Congo campaign, a campaign of the Enough Project, in support of the conflict mineral issue.

In 2010, she starred as Detective Serena Stevens on Law & Order: Criminal Intent, departing at the end of the ninth season. In September 2010, she took part in the documentary feature film The People Speak, directed and produced by Colin Firth and Anthony Arnove, televised on the History Channel, linked with The People Speak (Film) – International. Burrows modeled for Marks & Spencer's autumn 2010 campaign for their Portfolio range. In 2012, Burrows performed opposite Rob Lowe in the political comedy Knife Fight. She has participated in the "24 Hour Plays" in London, New York, and Los Angeles.

In 2013 and 2014, Burrows joined the ranks of the Marvel Cinematic Universe on the ABC television show Agents of S.H.I.E.L.D. where she played the S.H.I.E.L.D. agent Victoria Hand in a recurring role.

In 2019, Burrows starred in the recurring role of Dottie Quinn on the second season of the Netflix thriller You. She reprised her role in the third season, which released in October 2021.

She starred in the Amazon Video show Mozart in the Jungle as Cynthia Taylor, a cellist with the New York Symphony. The series ran for four seasons from 2014 to 2018.

Writing 
Burrows has written diaries, book reviews and newspaper and magazine articles for The Guardian, The Independent, and The Times and the New Statesman.

Personal life 
Burrows is a Fellow of the Royal Society of Arts.

Burrows is bisexual, and has said that she "prefers the company of women." She was engaged to actor Alan Cumming in the 1990s, and dated director Mike Figgis for five years until 2002. She was also previously in a relationship with actress Fiona Shaw.

Burrows married writer Alison Balian, her girlfriend of six years, in August 2013. Burrows gave birth to their son in 2012, and their daughter in 2017. They separated in 2020.

Burrows has expressed sympathy for European style social democracies and for French Socialist politician Ségolène Royal. She joined an anti-racism group when she was 11 years old and she went on to become the Vice President of the National Civil Rights Movement. Burrows is a campaigner for disabled rights and equality.

In 2009, Burrows became an American citizen.

Filmography

Film

Television

Awards and nominations 
Blockbuster Entertainment Award
2000: Nominated, "Favorite Newcomer Actress" – Deep Blue Sea

Screen Actors Guild Awards
2008: Nominated, "Outstanding Performance by an Ensemble in a Drama Series" – Boston Legal
2009: Nominated, "Outstanding Performance by an Ensemble in a Drama Series" – Boston Legal

References

External links 

Articles written by Saffron Burrows for the New Statesman UK
 Saffron Burrows' Guest DJ Set on KCRW KCRW Guest DJ Set

Living people
1972 births
20th-century American actresses
20th-century English actresses
21st-century American actresses
21st-century English actresses
Actresses from London
Alumni of the Anna Scher Theatre School
American film actresses
American stage actresses
American television actresses
English emigrants to the United States
English film actresses
English stage actresses
English television actresses
Bisexual actresses
English LGBT actors
People from Stoke Newington
People from St Pancras, London
People with acquired American citizenship